This is a list of electoral results for the Electoral district of Northern Rivers in Western Australian state elections.

Members for Northern Rivers

Election results

Elections in the 1990s

Elections in the 1980s

References

Western Australian state electoral results by district